Empire Beaumont was a British  cargo ship which was built by Furness Shipbuilding Ltd, Haverton Hill-on-Tees in 1942. She was owned by the Ministry of War Transport (MoWT) and managed by W Runciman & Co Ltd. Empire Beaumont had a short career, being sunk on 13 September 1942 while a member of Convoy PQ 18.

Description
Empire Beaumont was built by Furness Shipbuilding Co Ltd, Haverton Hill-on-Tees. She was yard number 345 and was laid down on 15 August 1941  Empire Beatrice was launched on 31 March 1942 and completed in June that year. She had a GRT of 7,044. Her port of registry was Middlesbrough. Empire Beaumont was managed by W Runciman & Co Ltd for the MoWT.

Career
Empire Beaumont was a member of a number of convoys during the Second World War.

UR 32
onvoy UR 32 sailed from Loch Ewe on 11 July 1942 and was destined for Reykjavík, Iceland. Arrival was on or about 16 July.

PQ 18
Convoy PQ 18 sailed from Loch Ewe on 2 September 1942 and arrived at Archangelsk on 12 September. At 15:15 on 13 September, Empire Beaumont was attacked by Heinkel He 111 aircraft of KG26 and torpedoed. Empire Beaumont was still afloat at 16:45 although it was believed that she had sunk by 18:30. Those lost on Empire Beaumont are commemorated at the Tower Hill Memorial, London.

Official Numbers and Code Letters

Official numbers were a forerunner to IMO Numbers. Empire Beaumont had the UK Official Number 164854 and used the Code Letters BDWD.

Propulsion

Empire Beaumont was propelled by a triple expansion steam engine which had cylinders of 24½ inches (62 cm), and  diameter by  stroke. It was built by Richardsons, Westgarth & Co Ltd, Hartlepool.

References

1942 ships
Ships built on the River Tees
Empire ships
Ministry of War Transport ships
Steamships of the United Kingdom
Ships sunk by German aircraft
World War II shipwrecks in the Arctic Ocean
Maritime incidents in September 1942